The 1875 Kilkenny City by-election was fought on 28 April 1875.  This arose due to the death of the incumbent Home Rule MP, John Gray.

It was contested by three candidates: Gray's son Edmund Dwyer Gray, Edward Marum, and Benjamin Whitworth, former MP for Drogheda. Gray told the electors that his programme did not differ substantially from that of Whitworth: he was in favour of "Home Rule, denominational education, fixity of tenure at fair rents, and reform of the Grand Jury Laws."

Whitworth was elected, with 307 votes; Gray received 125 and Marum 112. The Times saw this as a blow to the Home Rule League - who had condemned Whitworth's programme as vague and inadequate - and anticipated that he would act independently of the Home Ruler movement, although "he will probably be often found acting in harmony with the Home Rule Members".

The reason for the success of Whitworth, who was seen as having the support of the Protestant voters although he was also proposed by the Roman Catholic vicar-general of the diocese, was considered to be the "promises of material aid which he made to Kilkenny". His nomination was seconded by the prominent brewer John Francis Smithwick who would later succeed him as MP for the city.

Marum went on to be elected MP for County Kilkenny and Gray for County Tipperary.

References

1875 elections in the United Kingdom
April 1875 events
Kilkenny (city)
By-elections to the Parliament of the United Kingdom in County Kilkenny constituencies
1875 elections in Ireland